Sara Mustonen may refer to:

 Sara Mustonen (cyclist) (born 1981), Swedish racing cyclist
 Sara Mustonen (skier) (1962–1979), Finnish alpine skier